The Nayantaquit Trail is a  Blue-Blazed hiking trail system in Lyme Connecticut and is entirely in the Nehantic State Forest western block.   Parking for the trail can be found at several locations on Keeny Road inside the state forest.

Today it is composed of a  main loop trail plus two shorter side trails -- the a  'Cross Over Trail' (which bisects the main loop trail) and the  Uncas Pond Connector trail which connects the main loop trail to Uncas Pond.

Notable features include summits and boulders (primarily glacial erratics).

Trail description

The Nayantaquit Trail is primarily used for hiking, backpacking, picnicking, and in the winter, snowshoeing.

Portions of the trail are suitable for, and are used for, cross-country skiing and geocaching. Site-specific activities enjoyed along the route include bird watching, hunting (very limited), fishing, bouldering and rock climbing (limited).

Trail route
The  Nayantaquit mainline trail is a loop trail which is connected to a dirt parking lot off of the park dirt road portion of Keeny Road inside the Nehantic State Forest western block.

The trail system summits or travels near by the ridges and peaks of several high points.

The trail is entirely within the Nehantic State Forest.

Trail communities

The official Blue-Blazed Nayantaquit Trail is located in the Hamburg section of
Lyme Connecticut.

Landscape, geology, and natural environment

History and folklore

The Blue-Blazed Nayantaquit Trail was created by the Connecticut Forest and Park Association.

Historic sites

The name Nayantaquit is named after an indigenous tribe which inhabited the area of the western Nehantic State Forest block in Lyme Connecticut.

Hiking the trail

The mainline trail is blazed with blue rectangles. Trail descriptions are available from a number of commercial and non-commercial sources, and a complete guidebook is published by the Connecticut Forest and Park Association

Wearing bright orange clothing during the hunting season (Fall through December) is recommended.

Conservation and maintenance of the trail corridor

See also
 Blue-Blazed Trails
 Lyme Connecticut
 Nehantic State Forest

References

Further reading

External links
Specific to this trail:
 CT Museum Quest Article on the Nayantaquit Trail
 Connecticut Forest and Park Blue Blazed Nayantaquit Trail web page
 "A Walk Across the Giant" blog page - Nayantaquit Trail - Lyme, CT
 The Day April 2010 article on the Nayantaquit Trail 

Government links:
 State of Connecticut - Nehantic State Forest web page
 State of Connecticut - (Western) Nehantic State Forest Lyme Block map

Blue-Blazed Trails
Lyme, Connecticut
Protected areas of New London County, Connecticut